The Trece Martires–Indang Road (also known as Trece–Indang Road and Tanza-Trece Martires City-Indang Road) is a two-to-four lane  secondary highway in Cavite, Philippines.

Connecting the city of Trece Martires and the municipality of Indang, it is the fastest way from Trece Martires to Tagaytay. The entire road is designated as National Route 404 (N404) of the Philippine highway network.

Route description 
The highway forms the Trece Martires to Indang segment of Tanza–Trece Martires City–Indang Road. It starts at the intersection with Governor's Drive (N65 and N403) and Tanza–Trece Martires Road (N64) in the city proper of Trece Martires, as the physical continuation of the latter. It then runs south towards Indang, where it turns west in Barangay Alulod as it bypasses the town proper as San Francisco Javier Road and Mendez-Buna-Indang Road. It ends at the Y-intersection with Indang–Mendez Road (N402).

Intersections

References

External links 
 Department of Public Works and Highways

Roads in Cavite